Jaime Rolando Rosenthal Oliva (May 5, 1936 – January 12, 2019) was a Honduran politician, and leader of one of Liberal Party of Honduras's (PLH) wings, and was a perennial candidate for President. On March 20, 1974 he founded the Banco Continental. On October 7, 2015, Rosenthal was labeled a "specially designated narcotics trafficker" under the Foreign Narcotics Kingpin Designation Act.

Biography
His Romanian Jewish father, Yankel Rosenthal, emigrated from Romania to Honduras in 1929. His father married Esther Oliva from El Salvador. Rosenthal held a BS degree in Civil Engineering from the Massachusetts Institute of Technology and an MS degree from the MIT Sloan School of Management. He was one of the Vice Presidents (known as Designados Presidenciales) during the Presidency of José Azcona del Hoyo (Jan. 1986-Jan.1990) and resigned because of political differences. He was also a Congressman in Honduras, (Jan. 2002 to Jan. 2006). A 2006 study by the Friedrich Ebert Foundation named Rosenthal one of "the most powerful men in Honduras" (along with Fredy Nasser and Schucry Kafie).

Rosenthal died following a heart attack on January 12, 2019.  He was 82 years old.

Grupo Continental
Banco Continental was founded in 1974 and until its closure in late 2015 was the eighth largest bank in Honduras, forming part of Grupo Continental, itself founded in 1929 and owned by the Rosenthal family.

References

1936 births
2019 deaths
Vice presidents of Honduras
People from San Pedro Sula
MIT School of Engineering alumni
MIT Sloan School of Management alumni
Liberal Party of Honduras politicians
Honduran people of Salvadoran descent
Honduran people of Romanian-Jewish descent
Deputies of the National Congress of Honduras
Honduran Jews